Deborah Estrin (born December 6, 1959) is a Professor of Computer Science at Cornell Tech. She is co-founder of the non-profit Open mHealth and gave a TEDMED talk on small data in 2013.

Estrin is known for her work on sensor networks, participatory sensing, mobile health, and small data. She is one of the most-referenced computer scientists of all time, with her work cited over 128,000 times according to Google Scholar.

In 2009, Estrin was elected a member of the National Academy of Engineering for the pioneering design and application of heterogeneous wireless sensing systems for environmental monitoring.

Career
Estrin entered the University of California, Berkeley in 1977, majoring in electrical engineering and computer science (EECS). After graduating from Berkeley with a BS degree in 1980, she moved to the Massachusetts Institute of Technology, where she received her PhD (1985) in EECS under the supervision of Jerry Saltzer. She has also received honorary degrees recognizing her work: a degree honoris causa from EPFL in 2008, and an honorary doctorate degree from Uppsala University, Sweden in 2011.

Estrin was a Professor of Computer Science at the University of Southern California between 1986 and 2001, and at the University of California, Los Angeles (UCLA) between 2001 and 2013, where she was the founding director of the NSF-funded Center for Embedded Networked Sensing (CENS). In 2012, Cornell Tech announced Estrin as the first academic hire to the high-tech campus in New York City. At Cornell Tech, Estrin is the Robert V. Tishman '37 Professor of Computer Science. She is also the founder of the Health Tech hub and director of the Small Data Lab, and a member of the Connected Experiences Lab.

Estrin's research has focused on using mobile devices and sensors to collect and analyze data, with applications to health and well-being. Her non-profit startup, Open mHealth, created open data sharing standards and tools that allow developers of health applications to store, process, and visualize data. Her research also explores immersive recommendation systems and the privacy implications of user modeling and data use.

Estrin has received numerous academic and popular recognitions for her research. She was named one of Popular Science's "Brilliant 10" in 2003. In 2007, she was elected a Fellow of the American Academy of Arts and Sciences, and in 2009 was inducted into the National Academy of Engineering. She is a fellow of the ACM and the IEEE. In 2018 she was elected as a McArthur Fellow for "Designing open-source platforms that leverage mobile devices and data to address socio-technological challenges such as personal health management".

She is the daughter of the late Gerald Estrin, also a UCLA Computer Science professor, and of the late Thelma Estrin, a pioneering engineer and computer scientist also at UCLA.  She is the sister of Judy Estrin, and a wife to Ache Stokelman.

Awards
1987: National Science Foundation's Presidential Young Investigator Award
2007: Anita Borg Institute Women of Vision Award for Innovation
2008: Doctor Honoris Causa EPFL
2009: National Academy of Engineering
2011: Doctor Honoris Causa Uppsala University, Sweden
2017: IEEE Internet Award
2018: MacArthur Genius Grant
2022: IEEE John von Neumann Medal

Estrin is featured in the Notable Women in Computing cards.

See also
 Henry Samueli School of Engineering and Applied Science

References

External links

 TEDMED talk on small data, 2013
 Open mHealth
 Biography of Deborah Estrin
 Publications
 Video (6 min.) of Deborah Estrin being awarded the Anita Borg Institute's Women of Vision Award, 2007
 Video (4 min.) of Deborah Estrin's acceptance speech for the Anita Borg Institute's Women of Vision Award, 2007
 Center for Embedded Networked Sensing (CENS) home page

American computer scientists
Internet pioneers
Jewish American scientists
1959 births
Living people
American women computer scientists
Women Internet pioneers
Fellows of the Association for Computing Machinery
Cornell University faculty
Cornell Tech faculty
UCLA Henry Samueli School of Engineering and Applied Science faculty
University of Southern California faculty
MIT School of Engineering alumni
University of California, Berkeley alumni
20th-century American engineers
21st-century American engineers
20th-century American scientists
21st-century American scientists
20th-century American women scientists
21st-century American women scientists
Fellow Members of the IEEE
Members of the United States National Academy of Engineering
Fellows of the American Academy of Arts and Sciences
MacArthur Fellows
American women academics
21st-century American Jews
Members of the National Academy of Medicine